Elizabeth A. Tilton-Hoffine (December 2, 1918 – March 13, 2003) was an American vocalist.

The younger sister of Martha Tilton, she sang with Ken Baker in the 1930s and with Buddy Rogers later in her career. Liz Tilton also appeared with Bob Crosby in 1941 and Jan Garber in 1942.

References
Mention of Liz Tilton's death

1918 births
2003 deaths
20th-century American singers
20th-century American women singers
21st-century American women